The demographic features of the population of Japan include population density, ethnicity, education level, health of the populace, economic status, religious affiliations, and other aspects regarding the population.

Population

Historical population 

According to the Statistical Bureau of Japan, the population of Japan as of May 2022 is at 125.05 million, including foreign residents. The population of Japanese nationals only was 123.8 million in January 2021.

As of 2017, Japan was the world's eleventh-most populous country. The total population had declined by 0.8 percent from the time of the census five years previously, the first time it had declined since the 1945 census.

Since 2010, Japan has experienced net population loss due to falling birth rates and minimal immigration, despite having one of the highest life expectancies in the world, at 85.00 years  (it stood at 81.25 as of 2006). Using the annual estimate for October of each year, the population peaked in 2008 at 128,083,960 and had fallen by 2,983,352 by October 2021.

Based on 2012 data from the National Institute of Population and Social Security Research, Japan's population will keep declining by about one million people every year in the coming decades, which would leave it with a population of around 70 million by 2060 and 42 million by early 22nd century if the current projections do not change. More than 40% of the population is expected to be over the age of 65 in 2060. In 2021 the population had for fifteen consecutive years declined by 644,000 on this year, the largest drop on record since 1945 and also reflecting a record low of 831,000 births.  more than 20 percent of the population of Japan were aged 65 and over.

The population consisted of 47,062,743 households, with 78.7% in urban areas (July 2000). High population density; 329.5 people per square kilometer for total area; 1,523 persons per square kilometer for habitable land. More than 50% of the population lives on 2% of the land. (July 1993). According to research in 2009, the population to land density ratio has gradually increased, now at 127 million per 337 km2. Compared to the findings of July 1993 as well as in July 2000, the population density has greatly increased, from 50% of the population living on 2% of the land to 77%. However, as the years have progressed since the last recordings of the population, Japan’s population has decreased, raising concern about the future of Japan. There are many causes, such as the declining birthrates, as well as the ratio of men to women since the last measurements from the years of 2006 and 2010. According to the Japanese Health Ministry, the population is estimated to drop from its current state of 125.58 million to 86.74 million by the year 2060.

Japan dropped from the 7th most populous country in the world to 8th in 1990, to 9th in 1998, to 10th in the early 21st century, and to 11th in 2020. Over the period of 2010 to 2015, the population shrank by almost a million.

Census

Japan collects census information every five years, with censuses conducted by the Statistics Bureau of the Ministry of Internal Affairs. The latest population census reflects the situation as of 2020.

Population density
Japan's population density was 336 people per square kilometer as of 2014 (874 people per square mile) according to World Development Indicators. It ranks 35th in a list of countries by population density. Between 1955 and 1989, land prices in the six largest cities increased by 15,000% (+12% per year compound). Urban land prices generally increased 40% from 1980 to 1987; in the six largest cities, the price of land doubled over that period.  For many families, this trend put housing in central cities out of reach.

The result was lengthy commutes for many workers in the big cities, especially in the Tokyo area where daily commutes of two hours each way are common. In 1991, as the bubble economy started to collapse, land prices began a steep decline, and within a few years fell 60% below their peak. After a decade of declining land prices, residents began moving back into central city areas (especially Tokyo's 23 wards), as evidenced by 2005 census figures. Despite nearly 70% of Japan being covered by forests, parks in many major cities—especially Tokyo and Osaka—are smaller and scarcer than in major West European or North American cities. As of 2014, parkland per inhabitant in Tokyo is 5.78 square meters, which is roughly half of the 11.5 square meters of Madrid.

National and regional governments devote resources to making regional cities and rural areas more attractive by developing transportation networks, social services, industry, and educational institutions to try to decentralize settlement and improve the quality of life. Nevertheless, major cities, especially Tokyo, Yokohama and Fukuoka, and to a lesser extent Kyoto, Osaka and Nagoya, remain attractive to young people seeking education and jobs.

Japanese Prime Minister Fumio Kishida has pledged to take urgent steps to tackle the country's declining birth rate, calling it "now or never" for Japan's aging society, and plans to double the budget for child-related policies by June and set up a new government agency in April.

Urban distribution

Japan has a high population concentration in urban areas on the plains since 75% of Japan’s land area is made up of mountains, and also Japan has a forest cover rate of 68.5% (the only other developed countries with such a high forest cover percentage are Finland and Sweden).
The 2010 census shows 90.7% of the total Japanese population live in cities.

Japan is an urban society with about only 5% of the labor force working in agriculture. Many farmers supplement their income with part-time jobs in nearby towns and cities. About 80 million of the urban population is heavily concentrated on the Pacific shore of Honshu.

Metropolitan Tokyo-Yokohama, with its population of 35 million residents, is the world's most populous city. Japan faces the same problems that confront urban industrialized societies throughout the world: overcrowded cities and congested highways.

Age structure

Japan's population is aging faster than that of any other nation. The population of those 65 years or older roughly doubled in 24 years, from 7.1% of the population in 1970 to 14.1% in 1994. The same increase took 61 years in Italy, 85 years in Sweden, and 115 years in France. In 2014, 26% of Japan's population was estimated to be 65 years or older, and the Health and Welfare Ministry has estimated that over-65s will account for 40% of the population by 2060. The demographic shift in Japan's age profile has triggered concerns about the nation's economic future and the viability of its welfare state.

Life expectancy 
Sources: Our World In Data and the United Nations.

1865–1949

1950–2015

Source: UN World Population Prospects

Fertility 

Japan's total fertility rate (TFR) in 2012 was estimated at 1.41 children per woman, increasing slightly from 1.32 in the 2001–05 period. In 2012, the highest TFR was 1.90, in Okinawa, and the lowest was 1.09, in Tokyo. TFR by prefecture for 2000–05, as well as future estimates, have been released.

Sex ratio

Vital statistics
Live births, birth and death rates, overall fertility rate, and net change in Japan from 1899 to present.

Current vital statistics

Migration

Internal migration

Between 6 million and 7 million people moved their residences each year during the 1980s. About 50% of these moves were within the same prefecture; the others were relocations from one prefecture to another. During Japan's economic development in the twentieth century, and especially during the 1950s and 1960s, migration was characterized by urbanization as people from rural areas in increasing numbers moved to the larger metropolitan areas in search of better jobs and education. Out-migration from rural prefectures continued in the late 1980s, but more slowly than in previous decades.

In the 1980s, government policy provided support for new urban development away from the large cities, particularly Tokyo, and assisted regional cities to attract young people to live and work there. Regional cities offered familiarity to those from nearby areas, lower costs of living, shorter commutes, and, in general, a more relaxed lifestyle than could be had in larger cities. Young people continued to move to large cities, however, to attend universities and find work, but some returned to regional cities (a pattern known as U-turn) or to their prefecture of origin (referred to as "J-turn"), or even moved to a rural area for the first time ("I-turn").

Government statistics show that in the 1980s significant numbers of people left the largest central cities (Tokyo and Osaka) to move to suburbs within their metropolitan areas. In 1988 more than 500,000 people left Tokyo, which experienced a net loss through migration of nearly 73,000 for the year. Osaka had a net loss of nearly 36,000 in the same year.

With a decreasing total population, internal migration results in only 8 prefectures showing an increase in population. These are Okinawa 
(2.9%), Tokyo 
(2.7%), Aichi 
(1.0%), Saitama 
(1.0%), Kanagawa 
(0.9%), Fukuoka 
(0.6%), Shiga 
(0.2%), and Chiba 
(0.1%).

Emigration

About 663,300 Japanese were living abroad, approximately 75,000 of whom had permanent foreign residency, more than six times the number who had that status in 1975. More than 200,000 Japanese went abroad in 1990 for extended periods of study, research, or business assignments. As the government and private corporations have stressed internationalization, greater numbers of individuals have been directly affected, decreasing Japan's historical insularity. By the late 1980s, these problems, particularly the bullying of returnee children in schools, had become a major public issue both in Japan and in Japanese communities abroad.

Cities with significant populations of Japanese nationals in 2015 included: 
 Los Angeles, United States: 68,689
 Bangkok, Thailand: 48,700
 Shanghai, China: 46,115
 New York, United States: 44,636
 Singapore: 36,963
 London, United Kingdom: 36,721
 Sydney, Australia: 30,448
 Vancouver, Canada: 26,999
 Hong Kong: 26,869
 San Francisco, United States: 18,777
 Toronto, Canada: 13,410

Note: The above data shows the number of Japanese nationals living overseas. It was published by the Ministry of Foreign Affairs of Japan and relates to 2015.

Immigration

According to the Japanese immigration centre,  the number of foreign residents in Japan has steadily increased, and the number of foreign residents exceeded 2.8 million people in 2020.

In 2020, the number of foreigners in Japan was 2,887,116. This includes 325,000 Filipinos, many of whom are married to Japanese nationals and possessing some degree of Japanese ancestry, 208,538 Brazilians, the majority possessing some degree of Japanese ancestry, 778,112 Chinese, 448,053 Vietnamese and 426,908 South Koreans. Chinese, Vietnamese, Koreans,  Filipinos and Brazilians account for about 77% of foreign residents in Japan.

The current issue of the shrinking workforce in Japan alongside its aging population has resulted in a recent need to attract foreign labour to the country. Reforms which took effect in 2015 relax visa requirements for "Highly Skilled Foreign Professionals" and create a new type of residence status with an unlimited period of stay.

The number of naturalizations peaked in 2008 at 16,000, declining to over 9,000 in the most recent year for which data are available. Most of the decline is accounted for by a steep reduction in the number of Japan-born Koreans taking Japanese citizenship. Historically the bulk of those taking Japanese citizenship have not been foreign-born immigrants but rather Japanese-born descendants of Koreans and Taiwanese who lost their citizenship in the Japanese Empire in 1947 as part of the American Occupation policy for Japan.

Japanese statistical authorities do not collect information on ethnicity, only nationality. As a result, both native and naturalized Japanese citizens are counted in a single group.  Although official statistics therefore show homogeneity, other analyses describe the population as “multi-ethnic”.

Languages

The Japanese society of Yamato people is linguistically homogeneous with small populations of Koreans (0.9 million), Chinese/Taiwanese (0.65 million), Filipino (306,000 some being Japanese Filipino; children of Japanese and Filipino parentage). This can be also said for Brazilians (300,000, many of whom are ethnically Japanese) as well as Peruvians and Argentineans of both Latin American and Japanese descent. Japan has indigenous minority groups such as the Ainu and Ryukyuans, who generally speak Japanese.

Citizenship
Japanese citizenship is conferred jure sanguinis, and monolingual Japanese-speaking minorities often reside in Japan for generations under permanent residency status without acquiring citizenship in their country of birth, although legally they are allowed to do so. This is because Japanese law does not recognise dual citizenship after the age of adulthood, and so people becoming naturalised Japanese citizens must relinquish their previous citizenship upon reaching the age of 20 years

In addition, people taking Japanese citizenship must take a name using one or more of the Japanese character sets (hiragana, katakana, kanji). Names written in the Western alphabet, Korean alphabet, Arabic characters, etc., are not acceptable as legal names. Chinese characters are usually legally acceptable as nearly all Chinese characters are recognized as valid by the Japanese government.  Transliterations of non-Japanese names using katakana (e.g. 　"" for "Smith") are also legally acceptable.

However, some naturalizing foreigners feel that becoming a Japanese citizen should mean that they have a Japanese name and that they should abandon their foreign name, and some foreign residents do not wish to do this—although most Special Permanent Resident Koreans and Chinese already use Japanese names. Nonetheless, some 10,000 Zainichi Koreans naturalize every year.  Approximately 98.6% of the population are Japanese citizens, and 99% of the population speak Japanese as their first language. Non-ethnic Japanese in the past, and to an extent in the present, also live in small numbers in the Japanese archipelago.

Society

Lifestyle
Japanese people enjoy a high standard of living, and nearly 90% of the population consider themselves part of the middle class. However, many studies on happiness and satisfaction with life tend to find that Japanese people average relatively low levels of life satisfaction and happiness when compared with most of the highly developed world; the levels have remained consistent if not declining slightly over the last half century. Japanese have been surveyed to be relatively lacking in financial satisfaction. The societal view generally disapproves of out-of-wedlock births and premarital pregnancies.

Social isolation is a problem for a segment of Japanese society, with almost 500,000 young people belonging to this group, they are also known as hikikomori.

The Japanese management working culture in Japan has led some to work-related deaths due to heart attack or stroke, this has led to the term karoshi (lit. "overwork death"). The government has received 200 claims of karoshi related work injuries each year, with some leading to suicide.

Many Japanese lead a sexless marriage. Japan has the lowest level of couples having sex at 45 times per year, well below the global average of 103 times. With reasons of "tired" and "bored with intercourse" usually given as an answer. Despite this, Japan ranks as number two globally on the amount spent on pornography, after South Korea.

Marriages and divorce

Ethnic groups

Naturalized Japanese citizens and native-born Japanese nationals with multi-ethnic background are all considered to be Japanese in the population census of Japan.

Discrimination against ethnic minorities

Three native Japanese minority groups can be identified. The largest are the hisabetsu buraku or "discriminated communities", also known as the burakumin. These descendants of premodern outcast hereditary occupational groups, such as butchers, leatherworkers, funeral directors, and certain entertainers, may be considered a Japanese analog of India's Dalits. Discrimination against these occupational groups arose historically because of Buddhist prohibitions against killing and Shinto notions of pollution, as well as governmental attempts at social control.

During the Edo period, such people were required to live in special buraku and, like the rest of the population, were bound by sumptuary laws based on the inheritance of social class. The Meiji government abolished most derogatory names applied to these discriminated communities in 1871, but the new laws had little effect on the social discrimination faced by the former outcasts and their descendants. The laws, however, did eliminate the economic monopoly they had over certain occupations. The buraku continued to be treated as social outcasts and some casual interactions with the majority caste were perceived taboo until the era after World War II.

Estimates of their number range from 2 to 4 million (about 4% of the national population in 2022). Although members of these discriminated communities are physically indistinguishable from other Japanese, they often live in urban ghettoes or in the traditional special hamlets in rural areas, and membership can be surmised from the location of the family home, occupation, dialect, or mannerisms.  Checks on family background designed to ferret out buraku were commonly performed as part of marriage arrangements and employment applications, but have been illegal since 1985 in Osaka.

Past and current discrimination has resulted in lower educational attainment and socioeconomic status among hisabetsu buraku than among the majority of Japanese. Movements with objectives ranging from "liberation" to encouraging integration have tried to change this situation, with some success.  Nadamoto Masahisa of the Buraku History Institute estimates that as of 1998, between 60 and 80% of burakumin marry a non-burakumin.

Ryukyuans
One of the largest minority groups among Japanese citizens is the Ryukyuan people. They are primarily distinguished from their use of several distinct Ryukyuan languages though use of Ryukyuan is dying out. The Ryukyuan people and language originated in the Ryukyu Islands, which are in Okinawa prefecture.

Ainu

The third largest minority group among Japanese citizens is the Ainu, whose language is an isolate. Historically, the Ainu were an indigenous hunting and gathering population who occupied most of northern Honshū as late as the Nara period (A.D. 710–94). As Japanese settlement expanded, the Ainu were pushed northward, by the Tokugawa shogunate, the Ainu were pushed into the island of Hokkaido.

Characterized as remnants of a primitive circumpolar culture, the fewer than 20,000 Ainu in 1990 were considered racially distinct and thus not fully Japanese. Disease and a low birth rate had severely diminished their numbers over the past two centuries, and intermarriage had brought about an almost completely mixed population.

Although no longer in daily use, the Ainu language is preserved in epics, songs, and stories transmitted orally over succeeding generations. Distinctive rhythmic music and dances and some Ainu festivals and crafts are preserved, but mainly in order to take advantage of tourism.

Hāfu

Hāfu (a kana rendition of "half") is a term used for people who are biracial and ethnically half Japanese. Of the one million children born in Japan in 2013, 2.2% had one or two non-Japanese parents.[70] According to the Japanese Ministry of Health, Labor and Welfare, one in forty-nine babies born in Japan today are born into families with one non-Japanese parent.  Most intermarriages in Japan are between Japanese men and women from other Asian countries, including China, the Philippines and South Korea. Southeast Asia too, also has significant populations of people with half-Japanese ancestry, particularly in the Philippines, Indonesia, Malaysia, Singapore and Thailand.

In the 1940s, biracial Japanese children (Ainoko), specifically Amerasian children, encountered social problems such as poverty, perception of impurity and discrimination due to negative treatment in Japan. In the 21st century, discrimination against hāfu occurs based on how different their identity, behavior and appearance is from a typical Japanese person.

Foreign residents

In 2021, there were 2,887,116 foreign residents in Japan, representing 2.3% of the Japanese population. Foreign Army personnel, of which there were up to 430,000 from the SCAP (post-occupation, United States Forces Japan) and 40,000 BCOF in the immediate post-war years, have not been at any time included in Japanese foreign resident statistics. Most foreign residents in Japan come from Brazil or from other Asian countries, particularly from China, Vietnam, South Korea, the Philippines, and Nepal.

A number of long-term resident Koreans in Japan today retain familial links with the descendants of Koreans, that either immigrated voluntarily or were forcibly relocated during the Japanese Occupation of the Korea. Within this group, a number hold Special Permanent Resident status, granted under the terms of the Normalisation Treaty (22. June 1965) between South Korea and Japan. In many cases special residents, despite being born in Japan and speaking Japanese, have chosen not to take advantage of the mostly automatic granting of citizenship to special resident applicants.

Beginning in 1947 the Japanese government started to repatriate Korean nationals, who had nominally been granted Japanese citizenship during the years of military occupation. When the Treaty of San Francisco came into force many ethnic Koreans lost their Japanese citizenship from April 28, 1952 and with it the right to welfare grants, to hold a government job of any kind or to attend Japanese schools. In the following year the government contrived, with the help of the Red Cross, a scheme to "repatriate" Korean residents, who mainly were from the Southern Provinces, to their "home" of North Korea. Between 1959 and 1984 93,430 people used this route, of whom 6,737 were Japanese or Chinese dependents. Most of these departures – 78,276 – occurred before 1962.

All non-Japanese without special residential status (people whose residential roots go back to before WWII) are required by law to register with the government and carry alien registration cards. From the early 1980s, a civil disobedience movement encouraged refusal of the fingerprinting that accompanied registration every five years.

Opponents of fingerprinting argued that it was discriminatory because the only Japanese who were fingerprinted were criminals. The courts upheld fingerprinting, but the law was changed so that fingerprinting was done once rather than with each renewal of the registration, which until a law reform in 1989 was usually required every six months for anybody from the age of 16. Those refusing fingerprinting were denied re-entry permits, thus depriving them of freedom of movement.

Of these foreign residents below, the new wave started in 2014 comes to Japan as students or trainees. These foreigners are registered under student visa or trainee visa, which gives them the student residency status. Most of these new foreigners are under this visa. Almost all of these foreign students and trainees will return to their home country after three to four years (one valid period); few students extend their visa. Vietnamese makes the largest increase, however Burmese, Cambodians, Filipinos and Chinese are also increasing.

Asian migrant wives of Japanese men have also contributed to the foreign-born population in the country. Many young single Japanese male farmers choose foreign wives, mainly from the Philippines, Sri Lanka, Thailand, China and South Korea, due to a lack of interest from Japanese women living a farming life. Migrant wives often travel as mail-order brides as a result of arranged marriages with Japanese men. Additionally, Japanese men in urban parts of the country have also begun marrying foreign Asian women.

Foreign residents as of 2015 
There was an increase of 110,358 foreign residents from 2014 to 2015. Vietnamese made the largest proportion of these new foreign residents, whilst Nepalese, Filipino, Chinese and Taiwanese are also significant in numbers. Together these countries makes up 91,126 or 82.6% of all new residents from 2014 to 2015. However, the majority of these immigrants will only remain in Japan for a maximum of five years, as many of them have entered the country in order to complete trainee programmes. Once they complete their programmes, they will be required to return to their home countries.

As of December 2014 there were 2,121,831 foreigners residing in Japan, 677,019 of whom were long-term residents in Japan, according to national demographics figures. The majority of long-term residents were from Asia, totalling 478,953. Chinese made up the largest portion of them with 215,155, followed by Filipinos with 115,857, and Koreans with 65,711. Thai, Vietnamese, and Taiwanese long-term residents totaled 47,956, and those from other Asian countries totaled 34,274.  The Korean figures do not include zainichi Koreans with tokubetsu eijusha ("special permanent resident") visas, of whom there were 354,503 (of a total of 358,409 of all nationalities with such visas).  The total number of permanent residents had declined over the previous five years due to high cost of living.

Foreign residents as of 2021 
The number of foreign residents of Japan reached a high of 2.93 million in 2019 before falling to 2.76 million at the end of 2021. The number of foreign workers was 1.46 million in 2018, 29.7% are in the manufacturing sector; 389,000 are from Vietnam and 316,000 are from China.

On April 1, 2019, Japan's revised immigration law was enacted. The revision clarifies and better protects the rights of foreign workers. Japan formally accepts foreign blue-collar workers. This helps reduce labour shortage in certain sectors of the economy. The reform changes the status of foreign workers to regular employees and they can obtain permanent residence status. The reform includes a new visa status called . In order to qualify, applicants must pass a language and skills test (level N4 or higher of the Japanese-Language Proficiency Test). In the old "Technical Trainee programme" a foreign employee was tied to their employer. This caused numerous cases of exploitation. The revision gives foreign workers more freedom to leave and change their employer.

Religion

Shinto and Buddhism are Japan's two major religions. They have co-existed for more than a thousand years. However, most Japanese people generally do not exclusively identify themselves as adherents of one religion, but rather incorporate various elements in a syncretic fashion. There are small Christian and other minorities as well, with the Christian population dating to as early as the 1500s, as a result of European missionary work before sakoku was implemented from 1635–1853.

See also
 Demographic history of Japan before the Meiji Restoration
 Demography of the Empire of Japan
 Elderly people in Japan
 Largest cities in Japan by population by decade
 Shimojō, Nagano, a village whose birthrate is increasing

References

United Nations World Population Prospects (2004 revision). Data is for 2005.

External links

 Japan Population Census 2010
 Expatriates in Japan 
 "The Dilemma Posed by Japan's Population Decline"—Discussion paper by Julian Chapple in the electronic journal of contemporary japanese studies, 18 October 2004.
 The Exodus to North Korea Museum—Commemorates the story of the 93,340 people who migrated from Japan to North Korea in the period 1959–1984
 Another Tsunami Warning: Caring for Japan's Elderly—Brief on what the future of Japan looks like for an increasingly aging population, and if this demographic transition is limited to Japan alone
 Morita, Kiriro and Saskia Sassen. "The New Illegal Immigration in Japan, 1980–1992". International Migration Review. Vol. 28, No. 1 (Spring 1994), pp. 153–163. .

 
Demographic economics